Atomization refers to breaking bonds in some substance to obtain its constituent atoms in gas phase. By extension, it also means separating something into fine particles, for example: process of breaking bulk liquids into small droplets.

Atomization may also refer to:

Science and technology
 The making of an aerosol, which is a colloidal suspension of fine solid particles or liquid droplets in a gas
 An apparatus using an atomizer nozzle
 Sprays, mists, fogs, clouds, dust clouds and smoke, which appear to be atomized
 A nebulizer, which is a device used to administer medication in the form of a mist inhaled into the lungs
 An electronic cigarette atomiser is a component which employs a heating element to vaporize a flavored solution, that may or may not contain nicotine, for inhalation into the lungs
 The conversion of a vaporized sample into atomic components in atomic spectroscopy

Sociology
 Atomization is frequently used as a synonym for social alienation.

The arts
 Atomizer (album), a 1986 album by Big Black
 Atomizer (band), a British synthpop duo
 Atomised, a 1998 novel by Michel Houellebecq
 In fiction, the complete disintegration of a targeted object into the atoms which constitute it is accomplished by shooting it with a disintegrator ray

Places
 Atomizer Geyser, a cone geyser in Yellowstone National Park.

See also
 Enthalpy of atomization
 Atom
 Spray bottle